Ehsanullah Ehsan may refer to:
Ehsanullah Ehsan (banker) (died 1997), chairman of the Taliban's Central Bank
Ehsanullah Ehsan (Taliban spokesman), a current spokesman of the Taliban
Ehsanullah Ehsan (educator), a school principal and director the Afghan-Canadian Community Centre in Kandahar